In number theory and algebraic geometry, the Tate twist,  named after John Tate, is an operation on Galois modules.

For example, if K is a field, GK is its absolute Galois group, and ρ : GK → AutQp(V) is a representation of GK on a finite-dimensional vector space V over the field Qp of p-adic numbers, then the Tate twist of V, denoted V(1), is the representation on the tensor product V⊗Qp(1), where Qp(1) is the p-adic cyclotomic character (i.e. the Tate module of the group of roots of unity in the separable closure Ks of K). More generally, if m is a positive integer, the mth Tate twist of V, denoted V(m), is the tensor product of V with the m-fold tensor product of Qp(1). Denoting by Qp(−1) the dual representation of Qp(1), the -mth Tate twist of V can be defined as

References

Number theory
Algebraic geometry